Christian Fürstaller (born December 30, 1964) is a retired Austria international footballer.

References

Honours
 Austrian Football Bundesliga winner: 1994, 1995.
 UEFA Cup finalist: 1994.

1964 births
Living people
Austrian footballers
Austria international footballers
Austrian Football Bundesliga players
FC Red Bull Salzburg players

Association football defenders